A Star Fell from Heaven (German: Ein Stern fällt vom Himmel) is a 1934 Austrian musical film directed by Max Neufeld and starring Joseph Schmidt, Egon von Jordan and Herbert Hübner. It was shot at the Sievering Studios in Vienna. Two years later it was remade in Britain with Schmidt reprising his role. A later German-language film A Star Fell from Heaven released in 1961, was unconnected to the earlier productions.

Cast
 Joseph Schmidt as Joseph Reiner, Musikstudent  
 Egon von Jordan as Lincoln, ein berühmter Filmtenor  
 Herbert Hübner as Tomson, sein Manager  
 Evi Panzner as Annerl, Tochter v. Frau Bachinger  
 Elisabeth Markus as Frau Bachinger  
 Rudolf Carl as Kerndl, Filmfriseur 
 Alfred Neugebauer as Regisseur der Filmgesellschaft 
 Franz Johan as Schneider, Aufnahmeleiter  
 Karl Skraup as Dr. Freund  
 Karl Ehmann 
 Paul Gutman
 Reinhold Häussermann 
 Ernst Hausman 
 Eugen Neufeld 
 Ernst Wieland as Professor Türmer 
 Helga Demmer as Susi, ein 8jähriges Kind  
 Trude Krishaber
 Ernst Rollé 
 Das Wiener Boheme-Quartett

References

Bibliography
 Bock, Hans-Michael & Bergfelder, Tim. The Concise Cinegraph: Encyclopaedia of German Cinema. Berghahn Books, 2009.

External links

1934 films
Austrian musical films
1934 musical films
1930s German-language films
Films directed by Max Neufeld
Austrian black-and-white films
Films shot at Sievering Studios